Ophiorrhizeae is a tribe of flowering plants in the family Rubiaceae and contains about 364 species in 4 genera. Its representatives are found from tropical and subtropical Asia to the Pacific region.

Genera
Currently accepted names
 Lerchea  (10 sp.) - China, Vietnam, Java, Sumatra
 Neurocalyx  (5 sp.) - India, Sri Lanka
 Ophiorrhiza  (317 sp.) - tropical and subtropical Asia to the Pacific region
 Xanthophytum  (32 sp.) - tropical and subtropical Asia to the southwestern Pacific region

Synonyms
 Codaria  = Lerchea
 Hayataella  = Ophiorrhiza
 Mitreola  = Ophiorrhiza
 Mungos  = Ophiorrhiza
 Notodontia  = Lerchea
 Paedicalyx  = Xanthophytum
 Polycycliska  = Lerchea
 Siderobombyx  = Xanthophytum
 Xanthophytopsis  = Xanthophytum

References

Rubioideae tribes